Kent King Lambert (born 23 March 1952) is a New Zealand former rugby union and rugby league footballer.

Rugby union career
A prop, Lambert represented Manawatu at provincial level. He was a member of the New Zealand national side, the All Blacks, from 1972 to 1977. He played 40 matches for the All Blacks including 11 internationals.

Rugby league career
In December 1977, Lambert signed a three-year contract with the Penrith Rugby League Club in Sydney. However, injury curtailed his career and he retired in 1979.

References

1952 births
Living people
People from Wairoa
People educated at Te Aute College
Massey University alumni
New Zealand rugby union players
New Zealand international rugby union players
Manawatu rugby union players
Rugby union props
Penrith Panthers players
New Zealand rugby league players
Rugby league props
New Zealand expatriate sportspeople in Australia
Expatriate rugby league players in Australia
New Zealand hoteliers
New Zealand Māori rugby league players
Rugby union players from the Hawke's Bay Region
Rugby league players from Hawke's Bay Region